is a Japanese television jidaigeki or period drama that was broadcast in 1976. It is the second in the Hissatsu Karakurinin series. The lead stars are Tsutomu Yamazaki and Mitsuko Kusabue. It depicts the end of the Edo Period.

Plot
Dozaemon is a samurai of the Satsuma clan. One day his life was saved by Oriku. Oriku runs an inn in Shinagawa but she is also a boss of a group of killers(She takes charge of killing villains with money. Oriku's targets are always villains who escape justice despite their crimes. )Dozaemon joins Oriku's group.

Cast
Tsutomu Yamazaki as Dozaemon
Mitsuko Kusabue as Oriku
Hideko Yoshida as Oine
Kenkichi Hamahata as Naojirō
Peter (actor) as Shinnosuke

Directors
Koreyoshi Kurahara Episode1,5,7
Eiichi Kudo Episode2,3

See also
 Hissatsu Shikakenin   (First in the Hissatsu series)
 Tasukenin Hashiru  (3rd in the Hissatsu series) 
 Hissatsu Shiokiya Kagyō (6th in the Hissatsu series)
 Shin Hissatsu Shiokinin (10th in the Hissatsu series)

References

1976 Japanese television series debuts
1970s drama television series
Jidaigeki television series